Tage Jørgensen (15 October 1918 – 9 December 1999) was a Danish fencer. He competed in the team foil event at the 1948 Summer Olympics.

References

1918 births
1999 deaths
Danish male fencers
Olympic fencers of Denmark
Fencers at the 1948 Summer Olympics
Sportspeople from Copenhagen